La Barre can refer to:

Surname
 la Barré

People
 Antoine Lefèbvre de La Barre (1622–1688), governor of New France from 1682 to 1685
 Michel de la Barre (1675–1745)
 François-Jean de la Barre (1745–1766)
 Luc de La Barre de Nanteuil (1925–), Ambassador of France

Places in France
 La Barre, Haute-Saône
 La Barre, Jura
 La Barre-de-Monts, in the Vendée département
 La Barre-de-Semilly, in the Manche département
 La Barre-en-Ouche, in the Eure département

See also

 Barre (disambiguation)